Amalfi Airport  is an airport serving the town of Amalfi, in the Antioquia Department of Colombia.

See also

Transport in Colombia
List of airports in Colombia

References

External links
OurAirports - Amalfi
FallingRain - Amalfi Airport

Airports in Colombia